The following is a list of winners of the Golden Calf Occupation Award (also known as the Golden Calf Professionals Award) of the Netherlands Film Festival. In 2003, the category was split up into separate categories for Best Production Design, Best Sound Design, Best Music, Best Editing and Best Camera.

References

External links
 NFF Website

Occupation Award